Casey Calvert can mean:

 Casey Calvert, American pornographic actress
 Casey Calvert (Hawthorne Heights), musician in the band Hawthorne Heights